Charles Gerhardt may refer to:

Charles Frédéric Gerhardt (1816–1856), French chemist
Charles H. Gerhardt (1895–1976), American general
Charles Gerhardt (conductor) (1927–1999), American conductor 
Charles Gerhardt (United States Army officer) (1863–1957), United States Army officer